Beijing Rocks (北京樂與路) is a 2001 Hong Kong film directed by award-winning director Mabel Cheung about the rock and roll music scene in Beijing.  Starring Shu Qi and Daniel Wu, it was nominated for five Hong Kong Film Awards including Best Picture and Best Cinematography.

Cast and roles
 Geng Le - Road
 Richard Ng - Wu De-hui
 Shu Qi - Yang Yin
 Daniel Wu - Michael Wu
 Faye Yu
 Henry Ng

Production and Blacklash
Director Mabel Cheung began production in Beijing as of early 2000, interviewing indie rock bands in Shucun, Beijing. Numerous bands have provided advice on their lifestyle, mannerisms and costume choices.

However, on 14 October 2000, a list of 10 indie bands from the indie rock community in Shucun issued the "Shucun Statement" （樹村聲明). It expressed the disappointment of the rock bands during the production process. "We could change a line or a character's hairstyle, but we cannot change the shallowness and the crave for novelty in commercial filmmaking, since we could not make the creator(of the film) understand why we make such music and lifestyle choices." The bands went on to proclaim the end of their involvement with the film to at least not kill off their own image.

References

External links
 

2001 films
Hong Kong drama films
2000s Cantonese-language films
2000s Mandarin-language films
Films set in Beijing
Films directed by Mabel Cheung
2000s Hong Kong films